Acacia cochlearis, commonly known as the rigid wattle, is a shrub of the genus Acacia and the subgenus Plurinerves. It is native to an area along the coast from the Goldfields-Esperance to the Mid West regions of Western Australia.

Description
Stipules are present only on young fresh shoots. The trunk and branches have smooth green or brown bark. The leathery leaves have phyllodes or are sessile, patent to ascending, inequilateral basally, subulate-linear,  elliptic in shape and straight to recurved.
 
It blooms from July to October and produces yellow flowers. The flowers are pollinated by many different species of insects. A moderate number of seeds will be produced during favourable seasons. The green-brown pod which forms later is a linear shape and is slightly raised over the seeds. The valves of the pod will recurve once the seed is shed, usually in December.

Taxonomy
The species was first formally described by the botanist Jacques Labillardière in 1807 as Mimosa cochlearis as part of the work Novae Hollandiae Plantarum Specimen. It was then reclassified as Acacia cochlearis by Heinrich Wendland in 1820 as part of the work Commentatio de Acaciis aphyllis. It was reclassified in 2003 by Leslie Pedley as Racosperma cochleare then transferred back to genus Acacia in 2006. The species can be confused with Acacia melanoxylon.

Distribution and habitat
A. cochlearis grows in sandy soils and is found in coastal areas on sandplains and sand dunes. It grows in coastal areas from Lancelin to Israelite Bay, where it is found growing as solitary plants or in dense thickets.

Uses
The shrub is sold as a suitable medium size shrub for gardens in coastal regions or areas with sandy soils. It is also used to stabilise dune or coastal areas. A. cochlearis establishes quickly and reliably in stabilised soils. Although it is must be protected from high winds it is utilised in mixed plantings with other species such as Acacia rostellifera and Scaevola crassifolia. It is an indicator of good quality dunes as the
species is vulnerable to disturbance once established.

Cultivation
A. cochlearis can be grown from seed. The seeds should be soaked in hot water or lightly abraded with fine sandpaper prior to planting. They should be sown in free draining soil and can benefit from the addition of disease-free soil from existing plants to transfer the Rhizobium bacteria that are important in nitrogen fixation. Plants require a position in full sun.

See also
 List of Acacia species

References

cochlearis
Acacias of Western Australia
Plants described in 1820
Taxa named by Heinrich Wendland